Elections to the Mysore Legislative Assembly were held on 25 February 1957. 589 candidates contested for the 208 seats of the 179 constituencies in the Assembly.

State Reorganization
On 1 November 1956, Mysore state was enlarged by the addition of Coorg State, the Kollegal taluk of the Coimbatore district and the South Kanara district (except the Kasaragod taluk) of Madras State,  the districts of Raichur and Gulbarga from western Hyderabad State and the Kannada speaking districts of Dharwar, Bijapur, North Kanara, and Belgaum, (except the Chandgad taluk of Belgaum district) from southern Bombay State under States Reorganisation Act, 1956. The Siruguppa taluk, the Bellary taluk, the Hospet taluk, and a small area of the Mallapuram sub-taluk were detached from the Mysore State. This resulted in an increase in assembly constituencies from 80 with 99 seats to 179 with 208 seats in 1957 assembly elections.

Constituencies
There were 29 two-member constituencies and 179 single-member constituencies. Out of the 179 constituencies, 27 were reserved for Scheduled Castes and 1 was reserved for Scheduled Tribe. There were 73,01,080 electors in single-member constituencies while 27,05,851 electors in two-member constituencies. Total electors in the state were 100,06,931 and the electors who were entitled to vote were 1,25,15,312 (including two-member constituencies). 39,59,518 electors voted in single-member constituency while 24,60,641 electors cast their vote in double-member constituencies. The poll percentage in the state was 51.3%.

Results

!colspan=10|
|- style="background-color:#E9E9E9; text-align:center;"
! class="unsortable" |
! Political party !! Flag !! Seats  Contested !! Won !! Net change  in seats !! % of  Seats
! Votes !! Vote % !! Change in vote %
|- style="background: #90EE90;"
| 
| 
| 207 || 150 ||  76 || 72.12 || 33,43,839 || 52.08 ||  5.73
|-
| 
|
| 79 || 18 || New || 8.65 || 9,02,373 || 14.06 || New
|-
| 
| 
| 20 || 1 ||  0 || 0.48 || 1,23,403 || 1.92 ||  1.01
|-
| 
|
| 6 || 2 ||  0 || 0.96 || 83,542 || 1.30 ||  0.44
|-
| 
|
| 2 || 2 || New || 0.96 || 35,462 || 0.55 || New
|-
| 
|
| 251 || 35 ||  11 || 16.83 || 18,45,456 || 28.74 || N/A
|- class="unsortable" style="background-color:#E9E9E9"
! colspan = 3|
! style="text-align:center;" |Total Seats !! 208 ( 109) !! style="text-align:center;" |Voters !! 1,25,15,312 !! style="text-align:center;" |Turnout !! colspan = 2|64,20,159 (51.3%)
|}

Elected members

See also

 1957 elections in India
 Mysore State
 1952 Mysore Legislative Assembly election

References

1957
Mysore
Government of Mysore